Jargalyn Otgon (born 5 February 1957) is a Mongolian archer. She competed at the 1992 Summer Olympics and the 1996 Summer Olympics.

References

External links
 

1957 births
Living people
Mongolian female archers
Olympic archers of Mongolia
Archers at the 1992 Summer Olympics
Archers at the 1996 Summer Olympics
Place of birth missing (living people)
Archers at the 1994 Asian Games
Archers at the 1998 Asian Games
Asian Games competitors for Mongolia
20th-century Mongolian women